The men's 4 × 200 metre freestyle relay event at the 2012 Summer Olympics took place on 31 July at the London Aquatics Centre in London, United Kingdom.

The U.S. men's team smashed the seven-minute barrier in textile to defend the Olympic title in the event, and most importantly, to keep Michael Phelps' all-time record alive. The American foursome of Ryan Lochte (1:45.15), Conor Dwyer (1:45.23), Ricky Berens (1:45.27), and Phelps (1:44.05) dominated the race from the start to put together a blazing fast finish in 6:59.70. As the Americans defended their Olympic title, Phelps also surpassed Soviet gymnast Larisa Latynina to become the most decorated Olympic athlete of all time with a remarkable career tally of nineteen medals (15 golds, 2 silver, and 2 bronze).

France's Amaury Leveaux (1:46.70), Grégory Mallet (1:46.83), Clément Lefert (1:46.00), and Yannick Agnel (1:43.24, the fastest split in the field) trailed behind their newest rivals in the pool by a couple of seconds to take home the silver in 7:02.77. Meanwhile, China's Hao Yun (1:47.12), Li Yunqi (1:46.46), and Jiang Haiqi (1:47.17) struggled to keep their momentum throughout the race before Sun Yang dove into the pool at the final exchange. Sun then produced an astonishing anchor of 1:45.55 to deliver the Chinese team a historic relay bronze medal in 7:06.30, holding off the aggressive German foursome of Paul Biedermann (1:46.15), Dimitri Colupaev (1:46.36), Tim Wallburger (1:47.48), and Clemens Rapp (1:46.60) by 29-hundredths of a second with a fourth-place finish (7:06.59).

Australia's Thomas Fraser-Holmes (1:46.13), Kenrick Monk (1:46.67), Ned McKendry (1:47.60), and Ryan Napoleon (1:46.60) finished fifth in 7:07.00, while Great Britain (7:09.33), South Africa (7:09.65), and Hungary (7:13.66) also vied for an Olympic medal to round out a historic finish.

Records
Prior to this competition, the existing world and Olympic records were as follows.

Results

Heats

Final

References

External links
NBC Olympics Coverage

Men's 4 x 200 metre freestyle relay
4 × 200 metre freestyle relay
Men's events at the 2012 Summer Olympics